The following is a list of FCC-licensed radio stations in the U.S. state of Oregon, which can be sorted by their call signs, frequencies, cities of license, licensees, and programming formats.

List of radio stations

Defunct
 KCHC
 KCMX
 KEOL
 KEX-FM
 KGMW-LP
 KKPZ
 KSCR
 KTOD-LP
 KYAC-LP
 KYTE
 KZZF-LP

See also
 Lists of Oregon-related topics
 List of television stations in Oregon

References

 
Oregon
Radio stations